Lappi is a former municipality of Finland.

It was located in the province of Western Finland and was part of the Satakunta region. The municipality had a population of 3,236 (2003) and covered an area of 213.27 km² of which 7.24 km² is water. The population density was 15.2 inhabitants per km².

The municipality was unilingually Finnish. UNESCO World Heritage Site Sammallahdenmäki is located in Lappi.

Lappi was consolidated with the city of Rauma on 1 January 2009, was officially disbanded and since has been considered a neighborhood.

External links

 Official website

Populated places disestablished in 2009
2009 disestablishments in Finland
Former municipalities of Finland
Rauma, Finland